The 1965 Coppa Italia Final was the final of the 1964–65 Coppa Italia. The match was played on 29 August 1965 between Juventus and Internazionale. Juventus won 1–0; it was the fifth victory.

Match

References 
Coppa Italia 1964/65 statistics at rsssf.com
 https://www.calcio.com/calendario/ita-coppa-italia-1964-1965-finale/2/
 https://www.worldfootball.net/schedule/ita-coppa-italia-1964-1965-finale/2/

Coppa Italia Finals
Coppa Italia Final 1965
Coppa Italia Final 1965